Cambridge Corn Exchange is a concert venue located in Cambridge, England with a capacity up to 1,681 people.

Construction
The site, on the corner of Wheeler Street and Corn Exchange Street, was earmarked for a new Corn Exchange in 1868 to replace the existing corn exchange on St Andrew's Hill to the east. In the Middle Ages the Priory of Friars Hermits was located on the site, the remains of which were passed to a museum in New Zealand.

Designed by Cambridge architect Richard Reynolds Rowe in the Florentine Gothic style, the foundation stone was laid by the Mayor in 1874 and the building was opened in 1875. A quarter of a million local bricks were used in various colours.

The opening concert was a performance on 9 November by the Coldstream Guards and a local choral society. During the playing of the national anthem a mistake was made, and angry crowds subsequently attacked the Mayor's house. The resulting trial attracted the world's press and resulted in crowds of sightseers making visits to the building, interfering with the corn trading.

History

The site was a popular location for events throughout the 19th and 20th centuries. The first Motor Show of many was held in 1898, the venue hosted the London Symphony Orchestra in 1925 and one thousand people were welcomed to a Tea For a Thousand in 1935. During the 1940s the venue was used to clean and repair rifles by local women. After the war, the venue was popular for boxing, wrestling and roller skating. The floor was usually marked out for badminton matches which were held in the building. A temporary wooden bridge across Wheeler Street was even constructed in the 1950s to join it to the neighbouring Guildhall for balls and other events.

In 1965, the venue ceased being used for trading after the Cattle Market site was opened as an alternative. In the 1970s the building was used for pop concerts and one-day exhibitions. In 1972 Syd Barrett made his last public appearance at the venue supporting MC5. In 1974 1,000 fans caused a riot after The Drifters failed to appear onstage.

The venue was closed in 1981 after the roof was found to be unsafe and following complaints from local residents about noise levels. The building was refitted following public pressure and various grants and donations, with the first concert taking place on 3 December 1986 starring Box Car Willie, though an official reopening occurred the following February with a performance by the Royal Philharmonic Orchestra.

Current status

The venue is presently owned and managed by Cambridge City Council.

It is used for numerous touring events, including music groups, comedians and theatre groups. Performers who have played at the venue include Adele, The Who, Pink Floyd, Jethro Tull, My Bloody Valentine, Manic Street Preachers, Barenaked Ladies, Oasis, The Smiths, Iron Maiden (1980, 1981), David Bowie, Tin Machine, Queen, Paul Rodgers, Gary Moore, Lily Allen, James Bay, Steve Harley and Cockney Rebel, Take That, NXT UK, and Shane Filan of Westlife.

It is also used as an examination hall for students at the University of Cambridge, and hosts graduation ceremonies for Anglia Ruskin University.

References

External links

Venue history

Commercial buildings completed in 1875
1875 establishments in England
Music venues in Cambridgeshire
Theatres in Cambridge
Music in Cambridge
Culture of the University of Cambridge
Buildings and structures in Cambridge